Floribunda (1958–1979) was a British-bred Irish-trained Thoroughbred racehorse and sire. A specialist sprinter, he won his first three races (including the New Stakes by wide margins before his two-year-old season was curtailed by injury. In 1961 he was beaten in his first two races before returning to his best to win the King George Stakes and Nunthorpe Stakes. He was retired to stud at the end of the season and had mixed success as a sire of winners.

Background
Floribunda was a dark-coated bay horse with no white markings, bred in Britain by his owner Meg Mullion. Mullion, who owned the Ardenode Stud in partnership with her husband Jim, sent the colt to Ireland to be trained at the Curragh, County Kildare, by Paddy Prendergast, a trainer noted for his handling of precocious two-year-olds. His sire Princely Gift was a leading sprinter who broke the track record at Doncaster Racecourse when carrying 130 pounds in the 1955 Portland Handicap. Floribunda's dam Astrentia also produced his full sister Kew, the great-grand-dam of the Prix de Diane winner Sil Sila.

Racing career

1960: two-year-old season
Floribunda began his racing career in Ireland in spring, winning a maiden race at the Curragh Racecourse by twelve lengths. On his next appearance he set a new track record when winning over five furlongs at Phoenix Park. Predergast sent the colt to England in June for the New Stakes, one of the most important two-year-old races at Royal Ascot. Ridden by the Australian jockey Ron Hutchinson he started the 2/7 favourite and won by eight lengths.  His "runaway" win led to him being described as the best two-year-old of the season up to that point.

Floribunda returned to England in August when he was stepped up to six furlongs in the Gimcrack Stakes at York. He sustained an injury in the race and finished third behind Test Case. He did not run again that season.

1961: three-year-old season
On his first appearance as a three-year-old, Floribunda was tried over seven furlongs in the Tetrarch Stakes at the Curragh, but failed to stay the distance and finished unplaced behind Time Greine. Floribunda returned to sprinting at Royal Ascot in June and showed better form, without looking likely to win, when finishing second to Silver Tor in the King's Stand Stakes.

In July Floribunda returned to England for the King George Stakes at Goodwood Racecourse. Despite having sustained three consecutive defeats he was made 4/6 favourite and won decisively from the filly Cynara with the previous season's leading sprinter Bleep-Bleep in third place. Floribunda's best performance came at York in August when he was ridden by Hutchinson in the Nunthorpe Stakes. He won "in brilliant style" by four lengths from Cynara and Silver Tor. According to John Randall, writing in the Racing Post, the performance established Floribunda as "Ireland's greatest sprinter".

It was expected that Floribunda would run in the Prix de l'Abbaye at Longchamp in October and then stay in training as a four-year-old, but he never ran again and was retired to stud.

Assessment
The independent Timeform organisation rated Floribunda the best two-year-old of 1960 with a rating of 135. The official Free Handicap, however, was topped by the filly Opaline. In the following season, Floribunda improved his Timeform rating to 136, making him the second highest-rated horse in Europe behind the Prix de l'Arc de Triomphe winner Molvedo.

In their book A Century of Champions, based on a modified version of the Timeform system, John Randall and Tony Morris rated Floribunda the best British or Irish-trained horse of his generation. He was also rated the thirteenth-best British or Irish-trained sprinter and the sixteenth-best Irish racehorse of the 20th century.

Stud career
Floribunda retired to stand as a stallion at his owners Ardenode Stud. He had moderate results, the best of his offspring being Princely Son (Haydock Sprint Cup) and Porto Bello (New Stakes). He was sold and exported to Japan where he died 30 September 1979.

Pedigree

References

1958 racehorse births
1979 racehorse deaths
Racehorses bred in the United Kingdom
Racehorses trained in Ireland
Thoroughbred family 1-o